25thAnnie Awards
November 16, 1997

Best Feature Film: 
Cats Don't Dance

Best Television Program: 
The Simpsons

Best Home Video Production: 
Aladdin and the King of Thieves

Best Short Subject: 
Bjork: I Miss You(Bjork’s Music Video)

The 25th Annie Awards were given by the International Animated Film Association to honor outstanding achievements in animation in 1997. Cats Don't Dance led the nominations with 8 and won two awards, including Best Animated Feature, the first non-Disney film to win it. Disney's Hercules and Fox's The Simpsons won the most awards with four. The Simpsons won its Best Animated Television Program sixth time in a row.

Ceremony Information 
The 25th Annie Awards ceremony took place on Sunday, November 16, 1997, at the Pasadena Civic Auditorium in Pasadena, California. The ceremony started at 2:00 p.m. with a champagne reception, guests had ample time to meet and greet on the patio outside the theater. The show itself, hosted by voice actor Gary Owens, was a well-produced two hours of Owens' witty remarks and character voices, nominee footage, acceptance speeches, and introductions by presenters such as Bill Kroyer, Nick Bosustow, June Foray and Jerry Beck.

Production categories 
Winners are listed first, highlighted in boldface, and indicated with a double dagger.

Outstanding individual achievements in Film

Outstanding individual achievements in Television

Juried Awards 
Winsor McCay Award Recognition for career contributions to the art of animation
 Willis H. O'Brien Posthumous recognition
 Myron Waldman
 Paul Winchell

June Foray Award Recognition of benevolent/charitable impact on the art and industry of animation
 Phyllis Craig Posthumous recognition

Certificate of Merit Recognition for service to the art, craft and industry of animation
 Women in Animation
 The World Animation Celebration

Multiple wins and nominations

The following sixteen productions received multiple nominations:

The following three productions received multiple awards:

External links
 
 Annie Awards 1997 at Internet Movie Database

References

1997
1997 film awards
Annie
Annie